Michel Sordi (born 9 November 1953) is a French politician who was a member of the National Assembly of France. He represented the Haut-Rhin department, as a member of the Union for a Popular Movement.
He represented the 7th constituency from 2002 to its abolition in the 2010 redistricting of French legislative constituencies, which was effective at the 2012 election, then the 4th constituency from 2012 to 2017.

References

1953 births
Living people
Politicians from Mulhouse
Union for a Popular Movement politicians
Deputies of the 12th National Assembly of the French Fifth Republic
Deputies of the 13th National Assembly of the French Fifth Republic
Deputies of the 14th National Assembly of the French Fifth Republic